"The Impostors" is an episode of Thunderbirds, a British Supermarionation television series created by Gerry and Sylvia Anderson and filmed by their production company AP Films (later Century 21 Productions) for ITC Entertainment. Written by Dennis Spooner and directed by Desmond Saunders, it was first broadcast on 13 January 1966 on ATV Midlands as the 16th episode of Series One. In the official running order, it is the 19th episode.

Set in the 2060s, Thunderbirds follows the missions of International Rescue, a secret organisation which uses technologically-advanced rescue vehicles to save human life. The lead characters are ex-astronaut Jeff Tracy, founder of International Rescue, and his five adult sons, who pilot the organisation's main vehicles: the Thunderbird machines. In "The Impostors", International Rescue is framed for the theft of military aircraft plans and becomes the target of a worldwide manhunt. Grounded on Tracy Island, the organisation is faced with a dilemma when a mishap in orbit leaves an astronaut stranded in space, forcing the Tracys to choose between mounting a rescue and giving away their location, or maintaining cover and leaving the man to die. Meanwhile, field agents Lady Penelope and Parker track down the impostors who stole the plans.

In 1967, Century 21 released an audio adaptation of "The Impostors" on EP record (International Rescue, catalogue number MA 120), featuring narration by series voice cast member Shane Rimmer as Scott Tracy. The episode had its first UK‑wide network broadcast on 17 January 1992 on BBC2.

Plot
At the Aeronautical Research Station, a member of International Rescue saves a man from a collapsed well. The pair depart in an aircraft marked as Thunderbird 2. Unknown to onlookers, the men are impostors and the rescue was a front for breaking into the facility and stealing the plans of the AL4, an experimental strategic fighter. Determined to bring International Rescue to justice, General Lambert instigates a worldwide manhunt for the organisation. Before long, military forces are scouring the globe by land, sea and air.

On Tracy Island, Jeff (voiced by Peter Dyneley) declares International Rescue grounded until its name is cleared. To track down the impostors, he has agent Lady Penelope (Sylvia Anderson) interview witnesses to the staged rescue. Meanwhile, the organisation's other field operatives are ordered to report any unusual activity. One of them, "hillbilly" Jeremiah Tuttle, discovers aircraft tyre tracks near an abandoned mine. Returning to the cabin where he lives with his elderly mother, he uses a concealed videophone to inform Tracy Island. Jeff does not think the tracks suspicious, reasoning that they could have been left by a commercial aircraft making a forced landing. In fact, it was the aircraft flown by the impostors, Jenkins and Carela, who are using the mine as a hideout while preparing to sell the AL4 plans.

Posing as a journalist, Penelope learns that the aircraft was an EJ2 flying south-south-west. She alerts the Tracys, who calculate that the impostors must have landed near the Tuttles. Remembering the tyre tracks, Jeff orders Penelope and her chauffeur Parker (David Graham) to rendezvous with their fellow agents and apprehend the impostors.

In orbit, Space Observatory 3 is participating in the manhunt by monitoring the South Pacific (where Tracy Island is located) for unauthorised rocket launches. When the tracking equipment breaks down, astronaut Elliott performs a spacewalk to make repairs but accidentally discharges his thrusters and is hurled into space. Unable to retrieve Elliott, astronaut Hale informs Lambert that his colleague has only three hours of air remaining. Apprised of the situation by John (Ray Barrett), who has been monitoring communications from space station Thunderbird 5, Jeff refuses to order a rescue, knowing that Tracy Island will be exposed once Hale completes the repairs. Eventually, however, he changes his mind and dispatches Alan and Scott (Matt Zimmerman and Shane Rimmer) in Thunderbird 3. The brothers locate Elliott and bring him aboard.

At the Tuttles' cabin, Penelope declines Jeremiah's help in confronting the impostors and she and Parker set off for the mine on their own. FAB 1 gets stuck in a mud patch, forcing them to abandon the car and proceed on foot. Arriving at the mine, Penelope, who tripped over on the way, is dismayed to find her pistol jammed with dirt. Hearing her cries, Jenkins and Carela arm themselves with rifles and take aim at the intruders. However, they are prevented from firing by the arrival of the Tuttles, who throw a grenade (disguised as a tin of beans) into the mine to force the impostors' surrender. The manhunt is called off by order of the White House, and Elliott is returned to the observatory.

Production
The miniature model representing the EJ2 previously appeared as an air-sea rescue craft in "Operation Crash-Dive".

Reception
In her autobiography, Sylvia Anderson, who voiced Ma Tuttle, commented that the episode makes good use of "space age" themes that were topical for the 1960s. She also wrote that she played Ma as a "Beverly Hills hillbilly".

Rating "The Impostors" three out of five, Tom Fox of Starburst magazine characterises the episode as a mixture of serious and light-hearted moments, describing the story as "eventually engaging". He regards the Tracy family's "clash of interests" – whether or not to risk exposure to save a man's life – as the highlight of the episode. For Marcus Hearn, the Tracys' moral dilemma is more interesting than the plot about the stolen plans, which he calls the "MacGuffin in this multi-layered story".

According to Richard Farrell, the episode derives humour from mocking the military and the news media (neither of which can locate International Rescue, despite being quick to condemn them) as well as poking fun at British and American cultural differences (for example, Penelope's ineptitude versus the Tuttles' initiative). Noting that the Tuttles are capable and well equipped agents despite their "dozy hillbilly" ways, Farrell argues that they exemplify one of Gerry Anderson's "favourite themes" – the concept of people and things "not always being what they seem".

Fran Pheasant-Kelly, an academic who has studied the series' depiction of social class, observes that the Tuttles' status as "impoverished Southerners" – conveyed by aspects such as Jeremiah's "rough appearance" and actor Peter Dyneley's "drawling" voice for the character – belies their reliability and resourcefulness in coming to Penelope and Parker's aid. According to Pheasant-Kelley: "Given the obvious class differences between Penelope and the hillbilly couple, Anderson is clearly making a point about stereotypes in relation to social status."

References

External links

1966 British television episodes
Television episodes set in outer space
Television episodes set in the United States
Thunderbirds (TV series) episodes